George Alfred Lawrence Hearne (27 March 1888 – 13 November 1978) was an English born South African cricketer who played Test cricket.

Hearne was born in Catford in Kent and emigrated to the Cape Colony with his family in 1889. His father, Frank Hearne was a professional cricketer who played Test cricket for both England and South Africa and who was a member of the Hearne family of cricketers. He had played for Kent County Cricket Club and emigrated due to ill-health to take up a coaching position with Western Province.

George Hearne played first-class cricket as a right-handed batsman and wicket-keeper for Western Province between 1910/11 and 1926/27 and played in three Test matches for South Africa between 1922/23 and 1924. He made his Test debut against England in December 1922 at Johannesburg, playing two matches during the 1922/23 tour. Hearne then toured England with South Africa in 1924, playing his last Test match in the final Test of the series at The Oval.

Hearne died in Barberton, South Africa in 1978, aged 90.

References

External links

1888 births
1978 deaths
South African cricketers
South Africa Test cricketers
Western Province cricketers
Emigrants from the United Kingdom to Cape Colony